The Sociedad Iberoamericana de Gráfica Digital, SIGraDi (Iberoamerican Society of Digital Graphics) gathers researchers, educators and professionals in architecture, urban design, communication design, Product Design and Art whose work involves the new digital media.

It is an organization sister to ACADIA, eCAADe, CAADRIA and ASCAAD.

SIGraDi organizes a yearly congress when recent digital technologies and applications are presented and debated.

Annual congress
SIGraDi congresses are intended as a region wide effort for the interchange of experiences, debate of our disciplines' advancements and the creation of references for the iberoamerican groups involved in digital media applied to education, research and professional practice

SIGraDi Congresses
The annual SIGraDi congress is the main event organised under auspices of the association.
It is organised by a member in good standing, who volunteers for the organisation. The organiser is supported by members of the International Executive Committee.

During the years, SIGraDi has developed the policy to circulate the conference location in such a way that southern, central and northern areas of Latin America and Iberoamerica are reached regularly. In the past years, the following SIGraDi Congresses have been organised

References

Architectural design
International non-profit organizations
Computer-aided design software
Information technology organizations based in South America